Tattoo is a 1967 West German film directed by Johannes Schaaf. The film was selected as the German entry for the Best Foreign Language Film at the 40th Academy Awards, but was not accepted as a nominee. It was also entered into the 17th Berlin International Film Festival. The film won three German Film Awards.

Cast
 Helga Anders - Gaby
 Christof Wackernagel - Benno
 Rosemarie Fendel - Frau Lohmann
 Alexander May - Herr Lohmann
 Tilo von Berlepsch - Lohmann's Brother
 Heinz Meier - Sigi
 Heinz Schubert - Auctioneer
 Wolfgang Schnell - Simon
 Curt Ackermann - Voice of Lohmann's Brother (voice) (uncredited)

See also
 List of submissions to the 40th Academy Awards for Best Foreign Language Film
 List of German submissions for the Academy Award for Best Foreign Language Film

References

External links

1967 films
1967 crime drama films
German crime drama films
West German films
1960s German-language films
Films directed by Johannes Schaaf
Films produced by Rob Houwer
Films about adoption
1960s German films